George Gaines (June 6, 1933 – May 13, 1986) was an American set decorator. He worked on films such as American Gigolo and The Big Chill. He won two Academy Awards and was nominated for another two in the category Best Art Direction.

Selected filmography
Gaines won two Academy Awards for Best Art Direction and was nominated for two more:
Won
 All the President's Men (1976)
 Heaven Can Wait (1978)

Nominated
 Shampoo (1975)
 The Cotton Club (1984)

References

External links

1933 births
1986 deaths
American set decorators
Best Art Direction Academy Award winners
People from Illinois
Emmy Award winners